Lianzhou, formerly Lian County or Lianxian (postal: Linhsien), is a county-level city in northern Guangdong Province, China, and is the northernmost county-level division of the prefecture-level city of Qingyuan. It is known as the host city of the Lianzhou International Photography Festival (LIPF) and as a historic and cultural landmark of Guangdong Province.

History
Lianzhou became part of the Changsha Commandery during the Qin dynasty. During the Han dynasty, which began in 206 BC, the Yangxian prefecture consisted of three cities: Lianzhou, Liannan, and Lianshan. Emperor Kaihuang later put Lianzhou in the Ben prefecture during the Sui dynasty (581–618 AD).

On December 8, 1949, the Communist People's Liberation Army took over Lianzhou, then called Lianxian, from the Kuomintang. On December 20, 1949, the People's Government of Lianxian was established. On April 22, 1994, Lianxian was renamed Lianzhou City. In 1996, the government of Guangdong Province named Lianzhou as a National Famous Historic and Cultural City.

Geography

Located in the northwest portion of Guangdong, Lianzhou extends from 112° 47' to 112° 7' E longitude and from 24° 37'N to 25° 12' N latitude. It is situated on the Lian River and the Little Bei River, southeast of Yangshan County, southwest of Liannan County, and north of Linwu County. The total area under the city's administration is 2,663.33 square kilometres (1,028.32 square miles).

Climate

Lianzhou has a subtropical climate and is affected by the monsoon. From October through March, it experiences the northeast monsoon, and from April through September, it experiences the summer monsoon, mainly with a southwest wind. The city's mountain climate is good for crop growth and four-season tillage.

Administrative divisions
Lianzhou consists of ten towns (Lianzhou, Bao'an, Xingzi, Longping, Xian, Dongbei, Fengyang, Xijiang, Jiubei, and Dalubian) and two nationality townships (Yao'an and Sanshui).

Population

From 1953 to 2000, Lianzhou participated in five nationwide censuses:

Cityscape

Natural features
The natural environment of Lianzhou has been noted by poets such as Liu Yuxi and intellectuals such as Han Yu, who wrote about the area's landscape in Yanxiting Ji.

In the late Ming Dynasty, Qu Dajun explored the gorges in the Lingnan area and wrote Guangdong Xinyu, in which he praised the Huangchuan Three Gorges.

Tanling Rae'era is the highest lake in Guangdong Province, 640 meters above sea level. The Lianzhou Underground River, which runs through four mountains, is approximately 1,500 meters in length. Called "The First Underground River in Guangdong Province", it has many oddly-shaped stalactites, sea fogs, steep cliffs, old pines, thermal springs, and waterfalls.

Cultural sites
Lianzhou's cultural monuments include Yanxi Arbour, which was built during the Tang Dynasty, and Huiguang Tower, which was constructed during the Northern and Southern dynasties more than 1,500 years ago. It is known as the Oriental Leaning Tower for its tilt.

The Fushan Old Temple, one of the Grotto-heavens of Taoists, was also built during the Northern and Southern dynasties.

References

External links
Lianzhou Tourism Network

County-level cities in Guangdong
Qingyuan